The Halton Regional Police Service provides policing service for the Regional Municipality of Halton, which is located west of Toronto, in Ontario, Canada. Halton Region encompasses the City of Burlington and the Towns of Oakville, Milton and Halton Hills. As of July, 2020, the Halton Regional Police Service has over 1,000 members, including 718 sworn police officers and approximately 302 civilian and volunteer members. The service is responsible for policing a population of approximately 610,000 people in an area covering 692 square kilometers.

The chief of police is the highest-ranking officer of the Halton Regional Police Service. The position belongs to Stephen J. Tanner, who began his term on September 1, 2012, and was sworn in on September 4. The chief reports to the seven-person Halton Police Board which is independent from Regional or Municipal Council.

History

The Halton Regional Police Service was established in tandem with the creation of the Regional Municipality of Halton on January 1, 1974. It incorporated the former police services of Burlington, Oakville, Milton and Halton Hills and first consisted of 205 officers and 45 civilians. The Ontario Provincial Police continued to police the remainder of the region until 1975, when the regional force had expanded to the point where it could assume responsibility for the entire area.

In 2018 the new Halton Regional Police Service Headquarters at 2485 North Service Rd. W. was opened. The new facility totals 230,000 square foot in area.

Crest

 St. Edward's Crown
 ribbon containing Halton's motto Progress Through Participation
 the shield is based on the one for the Halton Region
 Trillium - official flower of Ontario
 wreath of golden leaves

Organization
The HRPS divides the region into five divisions (police stations) within three districts and one headquarters.

Headquarters

2485 North Service Road West, Oakville, Ontario, L6M 3H8

Chief Stephen J. Tanner

Deputy Chief Roger Wilkie

Deputy Chief Jeff Hill

District 1

Commanded by Superintendent Dave Stewart, Inspector Bruce Dickson
10 Division - (Queen Street Substation) 315 Queen Street, Acton
11 Division - 217 Guelph Street, Georgetown 
12 Division - 490 Childs Drive, Milton

District 2
Commanded by Superintendent Jeff Sandy and Inspector Crystal Dodds

20 Division - 95 Oak Walk Drive, Oakville

District 3
Commanded by Superintendent Derek Davis and Inspector John van der Lelie
30 Division - 3800 Constable Henshaw Boulevard, Burlington

Rank structure

Commanding officers
Chief of Police
Deputy Chief of Regional Operations
Deputy Chief of District Operations

Senior police officers
Superintendent
Inspector

Police officers
Staff Sergeant / Detective Sergeant
Sergeant / Detective
Police Constable / Detective Constable

Cadet Program
The Halton Regional Police Service established its one-year Police Cadet program in June, 2009. The primary purpose of the Police Cadet program is to promote and enhance the career development and experience of future Police Constable candidates. The Cadets assist front-line officers throughout the region, at community events. They are also assigned to a platoon, where they are assigned a mentor officer and exposed to all facets of front-line police work.

They have the following desired qualifications for cadets:
Between the ages of 19-24
Recent post-secondary graduate or in the last semester or post-secondary education

Units
Halton Regional Police Service operations are divided into a number of specialized units. These units include, but are not limited to: Drug and Human Trafficking, Firearms, Intelligence and Offender Management units, Child Abuse and Sexual Assault, Domestic Violence, Fraud, Homicide, Technology Crime, Canine, Tactical Rescue Unit, Marine, Explosive Disposal Unit, Marine Unit and a Regional Community Mobilization Bureau which includes School Liaison Officers, Community Safety and Well-Being, Crisis Outreach And Support Team, Mobile Crisis Rapid Response Team and Auxiliary Police.

Investigators are also assigned at the district level to the criminal investigation bureau which investigates crimes against persons and property.

The police service also has a ceremonial wing responsible for representing the police force at local events, parades, and internal police ceremonies. The Ceremonial Services comprises the Colour Guard, which is responsible for escorting the police colours on functions where their presence are required; the Chorus, a vocal group composed of civilian volunteers and serving police officers; and the Pipes & Drums, another musical ensemble which plays in a variety of parades and community events in the Halton area.

Community Policing Philosophy
The Halton Regional Police Service is widely known as one of the most progressive community policing services in Canada with its strong emphasis on the community. Community policing in the Halton region is a philosophy based on the concept that police officers and members of the public work together, in partnership, resulting in creative ways to solve contemporary community problems related to crime, fear of crime, social and physical order, and neighbourhood decay. In recent years the Halton Regional Police has incorporated an intelligence-led policing strategy which is built around risk assessment and risk management, utilizing analysis in crime trends to effect an appropriate policing response.

Special Investigations Unit
The actions of police officers in the Province of Ontario are overseen by the Special Investigations Unit (SIU) of Ontario, a civilian agency responsible for investigating circumstances involving police and civilians that have resulted in a death, serious injury, or allegations of sexual assault. The SIU is dedicated to maintaining one law, ensuring equal justice before the law among both the police and the public. Their goal is to ensure that the criminal law is applied appropriately to police conduct, as determined through independent investigations, increasing public confidence in the police services.

Complaints involving police conduct that do not result in a serious injury or death must be referred to the appropriate police service or to another oversight agency, such as the Ontario Civilian Commission on Police Services.

Fleet
 Ford Expedition
 Dodge Charger Police Cruiser
 Ford Taurus Police Interceptor
 Ford Explorer Police Utility
 Dodge RAM Police Undercover
 Dodge Grand Caravan Undercover
 Chevrolet Equinox LT Undercover
 Chrysler 300 Undercover
 Mobile Command Units (2)
 Armoured Response Vehicle
 Chevrolet Tahoe (Supervisor)

References

External links

Halton Regional Police Service

Regional Municipality of Halton
Law enforcement agencies of Ontario